Florbela Oliveira (born 26 April 1974) is a Portuguese actress who appeared in Morangos com Açúcar,  Dei-te Quase Tudo,  
Mundo Meu and Médicos de Familía and others.

TV
Os lobos (1999)
Diário de maria (1999)
Médico de Família (2001)
Espírito da Lei (2003)
Mundo meu (2005)
Morangos com açucar (2004/2005)
Dei-te quase tudo (2005)
Deixa-me Amar (2008)

References

1974 births
Living people
Portuguese television actresses
Actresses from Lisbon
20th-century Portuguese actresses
21st-century Portuguese actresses